Dimethazan (Elidin) is a stimulant drug of the xanthine class related to caffeine and theophylline. It also has tranquilizing and respiratory-stimulating effects and has been sold as an antidepressant.

See also 
 Xanthine

References 

Adenosine receptor antagonists
Antidepressants
Xanthines